Merton Emerton Hodge (28 March 1903 – 9 October 1958) was a playwright, actor and medical practitioner.

Born in Taruheru, Poverty Bay, New Zealand, he studied at Kings College in Auckland, Otago Medical School in 1925, graduated in 1928 (M.B., Ch.B), completed post-graduate studies at Edinburgh University.

As well as continuing his medical studies Hodge pursued his lifelong interest in theatre and continued to write plays throughout his working medical life.

Plays
Hodge is best known for his comedy The Wind and the Rain, which was performed 1,001 times, from 1933, at St. Martin's Theatre in London's West End, and six months in 1934 at the Ritz Theatre on New York's Broadway, toured the world and was translated into nine languages.
Plays produced in London:
 The Wind and the rain, St Martin's Theatre, 1933–1935;
 Grief goes over, Globe Theatre, 1935;
 Men in white (anglicised form), Lyric Theatre, 1935;
 The Orchard walls, St James Theatre, 1937;
 The Island, Comedy Theatre, 1938;
 Story of an African farm, New Theatre (from Olive Schreiner's novel), 1938;
 To Whom we belong, Q Theatre, 1939;
 Once there was music, Q Theatre, 1942;

Recordings
 My Life in the Theatre, series for overseas broadcast for British Broadcasting Service.

His suicide by drowning came in Dunedin in 1958.

Publications
The plays The Wind and the rain, Grief goes over, Men in white, The Island, Story of an African farm and a novelised version of The Wind and the rain, 1936.

References

External links
 Hodge's personal papers are held by the Alexander Turnbull Library , Wellington, New Zealand
 

1903 births
1958 suicides
New Zealand male stage actors
University of Otago alumni
Alumni of the University of Edinburgh
New Zealand male dramatists and playwrights
Suicides in New Zealand
Suicides by drowning
20th-century New Zealand dramatists and playwrights
20th-century New Zealand male actors
20th-century New Zealand male writers
20th-century New Zealand medical doctors